Harshpur (also pronounced Harakhpur) is a village in Pratapgarh District in the Indian state of Uttar Pradesh.

Demographics
As of the 2011 census, 2,057 people and 301 households resided in the village.  28% of residents were members of kshatriyas, a scheduled caste. The village is dominated by somvanshi kshatriyas or Thakur.

76.3% of residents were literate and 29% were employed. People from Harshpur hold high positions in military, law, engineering, healthcare and education.

13.1% of residents were under age 7. The gender makeup of the city was 45.5% male and 54.5% female.

Economy
The economy of Harshpur mostly depends on agriculture, producing crops year round.

Facilities and services 
A primary school in the village provides education to impoverished and lower caste children.

The nearest connecting railway station is Bishnathganj, also known as Vishwanath Ganj, which is approximately 9 km away.

The Mandhata police station serves the village and is about 1.25 km away.

Culture
Residents celebrate severals festivals including Holi, Vijayadashami, Diwali, Navaratri and Maha Shivaratri.

References 

Villages in Pratapgarh district, Uttar Pradesh